The Bois-de-Liesse Nature Park is a large nature park that spans several cities on the northwestern part of the Island of Montreal in Quebec, Canada. 

Most of the western reach of the park is in Dollard-des-Ormeaux, with a small part in Dorval.  The rest of the park spans the Montreal boroughs of Ahuntsic-Cartierville, Pierrefonds-Roxboro and Saint-Laurent. Bertrand Brook runs through the park.

The park is named after the Côte-de-Liesse, a former municipality that existed in the area, before being divided into Dorval, Lachine and Saint-Laurent in 1957. The town was named for Liesse-Notre-Dame in France.

The reception center is located in Pitfield House, which was built between 1952 and 1954 according to plans by the architectural firm Archibald, Illsley and Templeton. It was acquired by the Montreal Urban Community in 1979.

References

External links
  (Montreal's Nature Parks)

Parks in Montreal
Pierrefonds-Roxboro
Ahuntsic-Cartierville
Saint-Laurent, Quebec
Dollard-des-Ormeaux
Dorval
Protected areas established in 1984